Rhapsodies is a studio double album by English keyboardist Rick Wakeman, released in May 1979 on A&M Records. It was his last studio release on A&M and reached no. 25 in the UK. Described by Wakeman as "probably the most confusing I have ever made" due to the range of styles, it contains generally shorter tracks than his previous work to date, the longest being 5:32. All of his previous non-soundtrack albums had contained at least two tracks over seven minutes long.

Track listing
All tracks by Rick Wakeman, except where noted.

Personnel 
Music
 Rick Wakeman – keyboards, arrangements, vocals and vocoder on "Pedra da Gavea"
 Nico Ramsden – electric guitar
 Tony Visconti – acoustic guitar, engineer
 Bruce Lynch – bass guitars
 Frank Gibson Jr. – drums, percussion

Technical
James Lougheed – engineer, Mobile One tape operator
David K. Richards – assistant engineer
Michael Ross – album design, art direction
Paul Wakefield – photography

Charts

References

1979 albums
Rick Wakeman albums
Albums produced by Tony Visconti
A&M Records albums